Justice is a French electronic music duo consisting of Gaspard Augé and Xavier de Rosnay. The duo's label is Ed Banger Records, managed by Pedro Winter. Justice is known for incorporating a strong rock  influence into their music and image.

The band's debut album Cross was released in June 2007 to critical acclaim. The album was later nominated for a Grammy Award for Best Electronic/Dance Album and came in at number 15 on Pitchfork's Top 50 Albums of 2007 and number 18 on Blender's "25 Best Albums of 2007" list. It was nominated for the 2007 Shortlist Prize, losing out to The Reminder by Feist. The band's remix of the MGMT song "Electric Feel" won the Grammy Award for Best Remixed Recording, Non-Classical in 2009.

In September 2009, it was announced that Justice would be moving to WMG/Atlantic's newly relaunched Elektra Records label. The band reportedly started to work on its second album in mid-2010. The first single entitled "Civilization" was released on 28 March 2011. The band released its second album, Audio, Video, Disco, on 24 October 2011. This was followed by the live album on 7 May 2013, titled Access All Arenas. Justice announced their third album, Woman, through their Facebook page, and it was released on 18 November 2016. The band won a 2019 Grammy Award for Best Electronic/Dance Album for their album Woman Worldwide.

History

Early works, remixes, and Ed Banger (2003–2006)

Justice first produced tracks together for Musclorvision's "Hits Up to You", a concept compilation where tracks were designed to sound like they were meant for the Eurovision song contest. The compilation included two of their songs, and a track by Augé's alter-ego Microloisir. Justice first came to prominence through its 2003 remix of Simian's track "Never Be Alone", created for a Paris college radio station's remix contest. The remix resulted in the group being signed to Ed Banger (who released it) and became a hit in clubs and on the Internet. The song was re-released in 2004 on DJ Hell's International DeeJay Gigolo Records and eventually given a commercial release in the UK in the summer of 2006 under the title "We Are Your Friends" on Ten Records, a sub-label of Virgin Records.

After the original release of "We Are Your Friends", Justice worked on remixes for a number of French groups (Vicarious Bliss, Scenario Rock, and Gambit) as well as for larger mainstream acts such as Britney Spears, N*E*R*D, Fatboy Slim, and Daft Punk. Justice's first solo single, "Waters of Nazareth", was released on Ed Banger Records in September 2005 and was championed by DJs such as Erol Alkan, Eddy Temple-Morris, Tiga, 2 Many DJ's, and Ivan Smagghe. The track was re-released in 2006 with additional remixes. The duo's prolific remix work continued, as it turned in mixes for Franz Ferdinand, Mystery Jets, Soulwax, and Mr. Oizo.
Justice won the award for Best Video at the MTV Europe Music Awards 2006 for Justice vs. Simian – "We Are Your Friends". Augé and de Rosnay were not present at the ceremony, and the award was accepted by label art director "So Me" and video director Jérémie Rozan.

Cross, rise to fame (2007–2010)

Justice's debut album, titled Cross, was released on Ed Banger Records on 11 June 2007. The album was released in the United States on Downtown/Ed Banger. The album was preceded by the D.A.N.C.E. EP, released on 28 May 2007, which featured the tracks "Phantom" and the band's own remix of "D.A.N.C.E.", titled "B.E.A.T". "D.A.N.C.E." was nominated for "Video of the Year" at the 2007 MTV Video Music Awards. On 1 November, Justice received the "Video Star" award at the European Music Awards in Munich and was named the Best French Act of the Year. Justice was chosen to do a mix for the Fabriclive series in 2008, but Fabric rejected it. De Rosnay said that, "[T]hey weren't ready for something like this." Now titled "Justice Xmas Mix", the mix is available on the Internet.

Justice appeared as a Live PA at the 2007 Parklife and festivals around Australia, the 2008 Coachella festival; the 2007 and 2008 Sónar festival in Barcelona; Fuji Rock Festival in Niigata, Japan; the Hultsfred Festival in Hultsfred, Sweden; the Oxegen festival in Kildare, Ireland; the T in the Park festival in Kinross, Scotland; the Reading and Leeds Festivals in England; the Vieilles Charrues Festival in Carhaix, France; the Roskilde Festival in Roskilde, Denmark; Pukkelpop in Belgium, at the "I LOVE TECHNO" festival in Ghent, Belgium; Dour Festival in Belgium; Rock Werchter in Belgium; the Lowlands festival and the Pinkpop festival in The Netherlands; at Tennents Vital in the Radio One Tent in Belfast; at the Phoenix Park Marquee in Dublin; and at the Festival Internacional de Benicàssim in Spain.Justice was nominated for Best Dance Recording (for "D.A.N.C.E.") and Best Electronic/Dance Album (for Cross) at the 50th Grammy Awards. Justice released their music video for "Stress" on 1 May 2008. The clip features a group of youths committing acts of vandalism and harassment, wearing jackets bearing the Justice cross on the back. Accused in some quarters of racism for its stereotypical depiction of youths of African descent (both black and North African) from Paris' socially deprived banlieues (outer suburbs), others saw the video as a critique of the portrayal of blacks in the French media. Speaking in an interview with The Quietus, Augé said, "We were expecting some fuss obviously, but definitely not on those topics... If people see racism in the video, it's definitely because they might have a problem with racism; because they only see black people beating up white people, which is not what happens."

In an interview for Dummy in 2005, Justice said that it wanted a strong concept for each record it put out, and with this one, the duo wanted to keep people guessing. Asked in an interview whether their cross-based themes had received any negative feedback, De Rosnay said, "Eighty percent of France is Christian. My Dad was a bit uncertain and thought it was bad taste, but I was like, This is what I want to do Dad. It's odd because in America we have received support from Christian groups thanking us for spreading the word. We do not invert the cross and I suppose they think we look like nice guys so there has not been a problem."

On 1 June 2008, The Sun announced that Justice was chosen by Anthony Kiedis of the Red Hot Chili Peppers to produce the band's follow up to Stadium Arcadium, but this was quickly corrected by Ed Banger manager Pedro Winter, as Anthony Kiedis had only stated he was a fan of Justice, not preparing for a collaboration. In July 2008, Justice was revealed to have done a mix for the Dior Homme Summer 2009 Fashion Show, much like Daft Punk did for Louis Vuitton in 2007.
The track, now known as Planisphère, was released in four parts on the band's MySpace page.

On 25 August 2008, the band announced via MySpace that its next major release would be a DVD documentary/concert film titled A Cross the Universe. The announcement was also tied in with an invitation for fans to email photos, images, and artwork to an address so that the received photos could be compiled for use as artwork for the release. An iconic scene in A Cross The Universe happens in Las Vegas where, as a homage to US hard rock singer Axl Rose, Gaspard marries a groupie whom he had met three hours previously. During a DJ tour for the release of A Cross the Universe in November 2008, controversy arose when a photograph of Augé DJing with an unplugged Akai MPD24 surfaced. The photograph sparked accusations that Justice's live sets were faked. Augé has since said that the equipment was unplugged very briefly before being reattached and the band put a three-photo set of the incident on their MySpace page.

Justice played 2009 New Year's Eve in Chicago at the Congress Theater to a crowd of well over 4,000. Augé was seen later that night at an after-party thrown in honor of the band featuring various local DJs, artists, and photographers. In January 2009, French group Birdy Nam Nam released its album "Manual for Successful Rioting", for which Justice produced the last song on the album, "The Parachute Ending". The band's remix of MGMT's "Electric Feel" won a Grammy Award for Best Remixed Recording, Non-Classical in 2009.

In the November 2009 issue of Mixmag, Justice stated that it would be working on the soundtrack for Mr. Oizo's upcoming film, Rubber, saying they had to "finish working on the soundtrack for Mr. Oizo's new film before we start recording for the new album." In April 2009, the music website Stereogum hosted a remix by the duo of U2's song "Get on Your Boots", the lead single from the band's most recent album No Line on the Horizon. Their remix of Lenny Kravitz's song "Let Love Rule" was also featured on Kanye West's blog. Also in April 2009 at the Coachella Valley Music Festival, Augé was seen at the "Dome" with Busy P, DJ Mehdi, and Daft Punk. They played at the 2009 Voodoo Experience in New Orleans, as well as at the HARD Haunted Mansion in LA over the Halloween weekend.

Audio, Video, Disco (2011–2014)
On 14 March 2011, the duo announced via its Facebook page plans to release a new single entitled "Civilization" on 4 April. It was released on Ed Banger and Because Records and was the first single off of its second LP. The song has also been featured as the soundtrack to a new Adidas campaign spearheaded by French director Romain Gavras, with whom Justice has worked in the past.

On 28 March 2011, the Justice single, "Civilization" was released as a one-week iTunes exclusive, in full, as a premier for the release of the single on 4 April. On 27 May, the duo released the official music video for the single on YouTube. The video relies heavily on CGI and illustrates a world in which famous monuments (such as the Christ the Redeemer monument in Rio de Janeiro) are destroyed as gravity appears to be reversed. The storyline is of a herd of bison running from the falling ruins.

In August 2011, the band announced that its second record, Audio, Video, Disco, would be released 24 October 2011. In an interview with French magazine Tsugi, the duo disclosed the 11 song track list of the album, and described it as "a progressive rock record, played by guys that don't know how to play". Around this time label owner and manager Busy P played unreleased material from the album in his shows.

On 6 September 2011, a music video for the single "Audio, Video, Disco" was released by the duo via their Facebook page. The video features Xavier and Gaspard in a studio setting, and details the lengthy, rock n' roll style recording process that was experienced in making the single, and album. Within the clip, various instruments are seen, such as an electric guitar, a piano, and a drum kit, standing as the quite literal symbols for the Justice progression into a more rocky, less electronic sound. Several songs from this album have been used in the second series of the Channel 4 comedy Cardinal Burns.

In March 2012, the band played mainstage at Ultra Music Festival in Miami, Florida. The duo played many of its hits from its critically acclaimed debut album Cross, as well as many of the new tracks off of Audio, Video, Disco. In April 2012, Justice was also a headlining act at Coachella Valley Music Festival in Indio, California. Justice headlined at Montreal's Osheaga on 3 August 2012 and Chicago's Lollapalooza on Sunday, 5 August. Justice also played at San Francisco's Outside Lands Music Festival on Friday, 10 August. In October 2012, the band played at Voodoo Experience in New Orleans, Louisiana. Justice completed its world tour of the live show on 10 November 2012 playing at One Festival in Mexico City, Mexico.

On 7 May 2013, the band released its second live album, Access All Arenas, which was recorded at the Arena of Nîmes in France on 19 July 2012.

Woman (2014–2018)
On 22 June 2014, the band announced that they had started working on a third album. On 12 April 2016, Because Music revealed that Justice was in the process of signing record release documents. On 18 June 2016, a new single was revealed titled "Safe and Sound" at the Ed Banger House Party at the Sónar 2016 Music Festival. The track's name and its cover art were revealed through Shazam. The track was released for download on 13 July 2016. On 13 September 2016, Justice revealed on their Facebook page that their third album would be titled Woman.

On 14 September 2016, Justice released the album's second single, titled "Randy", through their Facebook page. Shortly after, Justice announced on their Facebook page that Woman was available for pre-order via iTunes. On 18 November 2016, Woman was released through Ed Banger Records and Because Music.

On 10 May 2018, Justice announced the release of a remix album, Woman Worldwide, on 24 August 2018 after their performance at the Google I/O conference in California. The album comprises new reworks of songs from their back catalog, which were initially played and reinterpreted during their live performances.

On 28 September 2018, Justice announced that they would be playing their "last live show for [the] tour and for [the] decade" at the HARD Day of the Dead Festival in California via their Instagram.

Gaspard Augé released his debut solo album, Escapades, on June 25, 2021.

On 18 March 2021, Rolling Stone reported that the duo band sent a cease and desist letter to Justin Bieber over the album, Justice, citing willful trademark infringement over the "cross" logo.

On 15 December 2022, Justice released the anniversary edition of †, including six new tracks between remixes and demos.

Musical style and equipment
Apart from the disco and funk influences of electro house, Justice's style has some heavy metal influence. Justice combines cut-up or slapped basslines with compressed and distorted synth sounds.

Each of the studio albums have had an accompanying live tour, with each having its own unique live equipment setup. The equipment has changed from tour to tour, but has remained centered on Ableton Live.

A Cross the Universe Tour 

Production equipment:
 an Apogee Ensemble Recording Interface
 a Power Mac G5 computer
 Cubase and GarageBand

Live equipment:
 a Korg RADIAS
 three JazzMutant Lemur Input Devices,
 two MacBook Pros running Ableton Live
 a Korg MicroKorg
 an AKAI MPD24
 a Korg ZERO8
 a Moog Minimoog Voyager
 a Pioneer DJM800.

On each side of "Valentine" (a non-functional modular synthesizer prop) are nine stacked Marshall cabinet fronts, adding up to a total of 18. The cabinet stacks are another nonfunctional prop that serve as stage dressing. Their DJ setup previously included two Pioneer CDJ-1000MK3s and a Pioneer DJM800, but since the A Cross the Universe release tour, Justice have been using Ableton Live controlled by an AKAI MPD24 and a Pioneer DJM800 for their DJ sets.

Access All Arenas Tour 
On the Access All Arenas tour, which accompanied the release of Audio, Video, Disco, Justice's live setup expanded to make use of more intricate lighting effects. The addition of this new set lighting was made with the artistic constraint that no video screens be used. The lighting involved a stripped-down, bold use of basic colors, so as to distract minimally from musical performance itself.

The audio equipment was also stripped down to an Ableton Live console, multiple Pioneer DJM800s for the mixing suite on-stage, a Minimoog Voyager, and a minimal number of other MIDI controllers. A 76-key keyboard was concealed within "Valentine" (still the prominently featured centerpiece of the stage), which was revealed at points during the show in which Gaspard or Xavier would play certain piano or organ portions of the setlist.

Woman World Wide Tour 
The Woman World Wide tour, promoting the release of the Woman studio album, marked another evolution of the live show to include more intricate stage lighting, employing minimal video effects and moving lighting fixtures, while remaining true to the refusal to rely on video or lighting effects as the primary focus of performance. The Woman World Wide tour would be the first tour not using "Valentine" as the center of the stage. However, the signature cross motif was incorporated into the lighting suite.

The audio rig for Woman World Wide incorporated a wide number of analog synthesizers, involving seemingly more manual performance and interaction from Justice themselves. The Woman World Wide equipment included two Moog Sub Phattys, two Moog Voyagers (one XL), a Roland TB-3 and TB-03, an Akai LPD-8, among other miscellaneous effects pedals, MIDI keyboards, and control surfaces - some appearing to be custom-made. A Native Instruments Kontrol S-series keyboard was also seen used in the televised performance at AccorHotels Arena in Paris, France. Following the previous pattern of using Pioneer DJM series mixers, the Woman World Tour set also used four DJM900s.

In March 2019, the band introduced IRIS: A Space Opera by Justice, a 60-minute film of a live show recorded in an empty space without an audience. The film premiered at South by Southwest on March 13, while a single projection in French theaters screened on August 29. Critical reception was very positive, with Mixmag describing it as a "sensory triumph."

Discography

Studio albums
 † (2007)
 Audio, Video, Disco (2011)
 Woman (2016)

Filmography
 A Cross the Universe (2008)
 Rubber (2010), music by band member Gaspard Augé and Mr. Oizo
 Iris: A Space Opera by Justice (2019)

Awards and nominations

References

External links

 
 
 
 

 
Ableton Live users
Because Music artists
Big Beat Records (American record label) artists
Club DJs
Downtown Records artists
Electro house musicians
Electronic dance music duos
Elektra Records artists
French DJs
French dance music groups
French disco groups
French electronic rock musical groups
French house music groups
French musical duos
Grammy Award winners
Grammy Award winners for dance and electronic music
Indietronica music groups
MTV Europe Music Award winners
Musical groups established in 2003
Musical groups from Paris
Nu-disco musicians
Remixers